Marion Weber (born 19 May 1959) is a former figure skater who competed for East Germany. She is the 1974 Richmond Trophy champion and 1977 Prague Skate silver medalist. Weber was selected to represent East Germany at the 1976 Winter Olympics and finished 11th. Her best ISU Championship result was fourth at the 1977 European Championships.

Results

References

1959 births
Living people
German female single skaters
Figure skaters at the 1976 Winter Olympics
Olympic figure skaters of East Germany
Sportspeople from Chemnitz